Rhagastis olivacea, the olive mottled hawkmoth, is a moth of the family Sphingidae.

Distribution 
It is found from north-western India across Nepal, northern Myanmar, northern Thailand and southern China to northern Vietnam.

Description 
The wingspan is 72–92 mm. It can be distinguished from all other Rhagastis species by the yellowish-green ground colour of the forewing upperside with narrow and indistinct reddish transverse lines and bands, and a shuttle-shaped marginal area bordered irregularly with bluish-white scales, most strongly at the apex and tornus.

Adults are lachryphagous (meaning they drink tears).

Larvae have been recorded feeding on Impatiens species in India.

References

Rhagastis
Moths described in 1872